In Portugal, a  is a benefit that was granted to knights in military orders, but now describes a purely honorary distinction. In the past,  could be a piece of land given as a reward for services, together with the duty to defend it from enemies and criminals.

See also 
 Honorific orders of Portugal

References 

Orders of chivalry of Portugal

pt:comenda